Akia Island is an uninhabited island in Avannaata municipality in northwestern Greenland. The name of the island means "turned on its side" in the Greenlandic language.

Geography 

In the east and south, another small waterway separates Akia from a larger Qaarsorsuaq Island. In the west, several small skerries such as Avannarleq, Qeqertasussuk, and Aorrussaq buffer the western coast from the open waters of Baffin Bay.

Pear-shaped and hilly, the island culminates in an unnamed  peak in the central-northern part of the island. There are many small ponds and lakes in the interior of the island.

Promontories

References 

Uninhabited islands of Greenland
Islands of the Upernavik Archipelago